Maurice James Dixon (6 February 1929 – 29 July 2004) was a New Zealand rugby union player.

Playing career
A wing three quarter, Dixon represented  at a provincial level, and was a member of the New Zealand national side, the All Blacks, from 1953 to 1957. He played 28 matches for the All Blacks including ten internationals. He later served as a selector for Canterbury (1963–65, 1968–71) and South Island (1976–80).

Biography
Born in the Christchurch suburb of Sydenham, Dixon was educated at Sydenham Primary School and Christchurch Technical High School. After leaving school, he worked at the Addington Railway Workshops, but became a travelling sales representative for a wine and spirits merchant in 1954. He subsequently was a publican. A stalwart of the Sydenham rugby club, Dixon was the club's delegate to the Canterbury Rugby Union between 1962 and 1967, and served as club president. He married Beryl Andrews in 1950 and they had three children.

References

1929 births
2004 deaths
Rugby union players from Christchurch
New Zealand rugby union players
New Zealand international rugby union players
Canterbury rugby union players
Rugby union wings
New Zealand sports executives and administrators
People educated at Christchurch West High School